Nevado Tres Cruces National Park is a national park located in the Atacama Region of Chile, east of Copiapó.  It includes Laguna Santa Rosa, Laguna del Negro Francisco, and a part of the Salar de Maricunga. The park is divided into two zones, the northern zone encompassing the southern portion of Salar de Maricunga and Laguna Santa Rosa, and the southern area the Laguna del Negro Francisco. The park is named after Nevado Tres Cruces, which dominates the landscape of the area. The park is managed by the Corporación Nacional Forestal (National Forest Corporation; CONAF), which offers two refuges in the area: one at the south of Negro Francisco Lagoon and other at the west of Santa Rosa Lagoon. The park is open from October to April.

Environment
The park lies in the northern end of the Southern Andean steppe.

Salar de Maricunga 
This salt flat spans 8,300 hectares at an altitude of 3,700 meters (12,139 ft).  The world's highest volcano, and the highest peak in Chile, Ojos del Salado, (6,893meters/22,615 ft.) is located in its vicinity. The salar is 180 km northeast of the city of Copiapó in the Andes mountains.

Laguna Santa Rosa 

Located just south of the Salar de Maricunga, the lagoon is known for its Andean flamingos, which reside on the lagoon year-round. Laguna Santa Rosa, along with Laguna del Negro Francisco, is a Wetland of International Importance under the Ramsar Convention.

Laguna del Negro Francisco 

Located 210 km northeast of Copiapó at 4,126 meters (13,537 ft.) above sea level, the lagoon is encircled by the foothills of the Andes. It offers a view toward Copiapó volcano. As a nationally protected area, there is an abundance of fauna, such as flamingoes and vicuñas.

See also 

Laguna Verde

References

 Parque Nacional Nevado Tres Cruces

Ramsar sites in Chile
Protected areas of Atacama Region
National parks of Chile
Protected areas established in 1994